Satapathy is an Indian surname, found among Utkala Brahmins of Odisha. Alternative spellings include Satpathi, Satpati, Satpathy and Shatapathy.

People with this surname include:
Nandini Satpathy, first female chief minister of Odisha
Tathagata Satpathy, politician from Odisha
Suparno Satpathy, socio-political leader from Odisha
Ratikant Satpathy, renowned playback singer and media professional from Odisha

References

Hindu surnames
Social groups of Odisha